Fabricio Brandão Santos (born 16 April 1982) is a retired Brazilian football defender.

References

1982 births
Living people
Footballers from Rio de Janeiro (city)
Brazilian footballers
S.L. Benfica (Luanda) players
Club Blooming players
Club San José players
America Football Club (Rio de Janeiro) players
Club Petrolero players
Ceres Futebol Clube players
Duque de Caxias Futebol Clube players
Bolivian Primera División players
Association football defenders
Brazilian expatriate footballers
Expatriate footballers in Angola
Brazilian expatriate sportspeople in Angola
Expatriate footballers in Bolivia
Brazilian expatriate sportspeople in Bolivia